Erkki Gustafsson (31 December 1912 – 13 January 1966) was a Finnish footballer. He competed in the men's tournament at the 1936 Summer Olympics. He played mostly for Helsingin Toverit, scoring 30 goals for them in 87 matches in Mestaruussarja. He also played for a number of other Helsinki based teams in his career.

References

External links

1912 births
1966 deaths
Finnish footballers
Finland international footballers
Olympic footballers of Finland
Footballers at the 1936 Summer Olympics
Footballers from Helsinki
Association football midfielders
20th-century Finnish people